The 2019–20 Real Madrid Club de Fútbol season was the club's 116th season in existence and its 89th consecutive season in the top flight of Spanish football. It covered a period from 1 July 2019 to 7 August 2020.

This season was the first since 2013–14 without goalkeeper Keylor Navas, who departed for Paris Saint-Germain.

Kits
Supplier: Adidas / Sponsor: Emirates

Summary

Pre-season

On 4 June, Luka Jović signed from Eintracht Frankfurt on a contract until 2025. Three days later Eden Hazard was acquired from Chelsea, while Ferland Mendy was bought from Lyon on a six-year contract on 12 June. On 20 June, Marcos Llorente was sold to Atlético Madrid, and Mateo Kovačić joined Chelsea on 1 July, having spent the previous season there on loan.

August
The first match of the season, on 17 August 2019, saw a 3–1 victory for Madrid at Celta Vigo. The goals came from Karim Benzema, Toni Kroos and Lucas Vázquez. A week later, the game against Valladolid ended in a 1–1 draw after Benzema initially gave Real the lead.

September
On the first day of the month, Gareth Bale secured one point for Real in a 2–2 draw, after he equalized the game twice at Villarreal. A day later, Keylor Navas left Madrid to join Paris Saint-Germain, with Alphonse Areola replacing him on a one-year loan deal from the Parisians. On 14 September, a brace from Benzema and a goal from Casemiro gave Madrid a 3–0 lead, before Levante was able to cut it to 3–2, which was the final result. In the new Champions League season, Madrid started with a 0–3 loss at Paris on 18 September. Another goal from Benzema lifted Madrid to a 1–0 win at Sevilla on 22 September. Three days later, goals from Vinícius Júnior and Rodrygo secured a 2–0 home win over Osasuna, putting Madrid at the top of the table. The Madrid derby on 28 September ended in a goalless draw.

October
On the first day of the month, Madrid took on Club Brugge in the Champions League. The game ended in a 2–2 draw, after Sergio Ramos and Casemiro brought Madrid back from a 0–2 deficit. Four days later, Real defeated Granada 4–2 with goals from Benzema, Hazard, Luka Modrić and James Rodríguez. On 19 October, the away game at Mallorca was lost 0–1. The Champions League match at Galatasaray was won 1–0 after a goal from Kroos. On 30 October, the match against CD Leganés was won 5–0 with goals from Rodrygo, Kroos, Sergio Ramos, Benzema and Jović.

November
On 2 November, the game against Real Betis ended in a 0–0 draw. The game against Galatasaray in the Champions League was won 6–0 after a hat-trick from Rodrygo, a brace from Benzema and a goal from Ramos. Three days later, the away game at SD Eibar was won 4–0 with a brace from Benzema and goals from Ramos and Valverde. After the international break, Madrid recorded a 3–1 victory over Real Sociedad on 23 November. After falling behind early, goals from Benzema, Valverde and Modrić secured the three points. Three days later, the Champions league match against Paris ended in a 2–2 draw, with a brace from Benzema initially putting Real up 2–0 only for Paris to score two successive goals late in the game. With that draw, Madrid advanced to the knockout stage of the tournament for the 23rd time in a row. On the last day of the month, goals from Ramos and Dani Carvajal got Madrid a 2–1 win at Alavés.

December
The game against Espanyol on 7 December ended in a 2–0 win after Raphaël Varane and Benzema scored. Four days later, the last Champions League group stage game at Brugge was won 3–1, with Rodrygo, Vinícius and Modrić scoring the goals. A late goal from Benzema saved Madrid one point in a 1–1 draw at Valencia on 15 December. The season's first Clásico against Barcelona on 18 December resulted in a 0–0 stalemate, with Madrid thoroughly outplaying Barça away from home but failing to convert. Four days later, the last game of the year against Athletic Bilbao also ended 0–0.

January
The new year started with a 3–0 victory against Getafe on 4 January. The goals were scored by Varane and Modrić plus an own goal. Four days later, Valencia was defeated 3–1 in the semi-final of the 2019–20 Supercopa de España after goals from Kroos, Isco and Modrić. On 12 January, the Supercopa was won 4–1 in a penalty shootout against Atlético Madrid, with the match itself having ended in a 0–0 draw. This marked the eleventh time that Madrid won the trophy. Next, a brace from Casemiro secured three points for Real in a 2–1 victory over Sevilla. Reinier Jesus Carvalho joined Madrid on 20 January 2020. Two days later, in the round of 32 of the 2019–20 Copa del Rey, Madrid defeated Unionistas de Salamanca CF 3–1 with goals from Bale, Brahim Díaz and an own goal to advance to the next round. In the last league game for this month, Madrid beat Valladolid 1–0 at the José Zorrilla Stadium to move to the top of the table and establish a three-point lead over Barcelona. The only goal was scored by Nacho. On 29 January, Real defeated Zaragoza 4–0 to proceed to the quarter-finals of the Copa del Rey. The goals were scored by Varane, Vázquez, Vinícius and Benzema.

February
The first day of the new month brought another Madrid derby against Atlético. Benzema scored the lone goal of the game to give Real a 1–0 win. Five days later, Madrid lost the Copa del Rey quarter-final match to Sociedad 3–4, with Marcelo, Rodrygo and Nacho scoring the goals in an attempted late comeback. With that result, Madrid's drought in the competition extended to six years. The game against Osasuna on 9 February was won 4–1. Isco, Ramos, Vázquez and Jović scored the goals after Madrid fell behind early. A week later, the game against Celta Vigo ended in a 2–2 draw with a late equalizer, despite Kroos and Ramos giving Real a 2–1 lead. On 22 February, the match against Levante was lost 0–1 due to a late goal. The first leg of the Champions League round of 16 against Manchester City was lost 1–2. Isco scored the lone goal for Madrid.

March
On the first day of the month, Real defeated Barcelona 2–0 in the season's second Clásico. Vinícius and Mariano scored the goals, with Madrid regaining the lead position in the standings. A week later, the away game at Betis was lost 1–2, meaning Madrid again slipped to second. Benzema scored the penalty for Real. On 12 March, after a player from Real Madrid's basketball team tested positive for SARS-CoV-2, all players of basketball and football teams alike were forced into quarantine. This superseded the postponements of several matches. On 23 March, following the outbreak of the COVID-19 pandemic in Europe, the league was suspended indefinitely.

May
After a two and a half-month hiatus, it was announced on 31 May that the league would be resumed on 11 June, with all games being played behind closed doors.

June
In Madrid's first game back after the break on 14 June, Eibar was defeated 3–1 with goals from Kroos, Ramos and Marcelo. Four days later, the game against Valencia ended in a 3–0 victory, with a brace from Benzema and a goal from Asensio. On 21 June, Madrid was able to defeat Real Sociedad by a 2–1 margin, getting back to the top of the table. The goals were scored by Ramos and Benzema. Another three days later, Mallorca was defeated 2–0 with goals from Vinícius and Ramos. A goal from Casemiro secured another three points for Real, as they defeated Espanyol 1–0 on 28 June.

July
On 2 July, Getafe was defeated 1–0 per a Ramos penalty, which gave Madrid a four-point cushion at the top of the table. The exact same scenario secured Real another victory three days later, against Bilbao. On 10 July, Alavés was defeated 2–0, after Benzema and Asensio scored. Two early goals from Mendy and Benzema secured Madrid their ninth win in a row with a 2–1 victory at Granada. After that game, Real had a four-point lead in the standings with two matches to go. After a narrow 2–1 home victory over Villarreal on 16 July, thanks to a brace from Benzema, Madrid mathematically clinched a record-extending 34th league title. Conversely, this was only their third title since the start of Barcelona's dominance in the 2008–09 season. Three days later, the last league game of the season at Leganés was drawn 2–2 with goals from Ramos and Asensio.

August
After the league was finished, Madrid went on to play the postponed second leg of the Champions League against Manchester City on 7 August. The match was a practical repeat of the first leg, with Madrid losing 1–2 and being eliminated 2–4 on aggregate. The lone goal came from Benzema who scored an equalizer in the first half. This result meant that Real had been knocked out in the round of 16 for the second season running.

Players

Transfers

In

Total spending:  €352.5M

Out

Total income:  €132.1M
Net income:  €190.4M

Pre-season and friendlies
Madrid competed at the 2019 International Champions Cup and the 2019 Audi Cup.

Competitions

Overview

La Liga

League table

Results summary

Result round by round

Matches
La Liga schedule was announced on 4 July 2019.

Copa del Rey

Madrid joined the tournament in the round of 32, as they had participated in the 2019–20 Supercopa de España.

Supercopa de España

The draw was held on 11 November 2019.

UEFA Champions League

Group stage

Knockout phase

Round of 16

Statistics

Squad statistics

‡ Player left the club mid-season

Goals

Clean sheets

Disciplinary record

Notes

References

External links

Real Madrid CF seasons
Real Madrid
Real Madrid
Spanish football championship-winning seasons